Dick Mize (born December 17, 1935) is an American biathlete. He competed in the 20 km individual event at the 1960 Winter Olympics.

References

1935 births
Living people
American male biathletes
Olympic biathletes of the United States
Biathletes at the 1960 Winter Olympics
People from Eagle County, Colorado